Guasticce is a town in Tuscany, central Italy, administratively a frazione of the comune of Collesalvetti, province of Livorno.

The town is about 11 km from Livorno and 6 km from Collesalvetti.

Bibliography 
 

Frazioni of the Province of Livorno